The Mirage Marathon is an American homebuilt aircraft, designed and produced by Mirage Aircraft Corporation of Prescott Valley, Arizona. The aircraft is supplied in the form of plans for amateur construction, with materials kits supplied by Aircraft Spruce & Specialty Co. and Wicks Aircraft Supply as well as some specialized parts supplied by the manufacturer.

Design and development
The Marathon is a fixed landing gear development of the retractable landing gear equipped Mirage Celerity which was designed by Larry Burton. The design goals include high performance cross county flying at low cost.

The Marathon features a cantilever low-wing, a two-seats-in-side-by-side configuration enclosed cockpit, fixed tricycle landing gear or optionally conventional landing gear with wheel pants and a single engine in tractor configuration.

The aircraft is made from wood, foam and fiberglass.

The factory provides some specialized parts for the construction of the aircraft, including leading edge fuel tanks, the aircraft canopy and landing gear.

Operational history
By 1998 the company reported that ten kits had been sold.

In January 2014 one example was registered in the United States with the Federal Aviation Administration.

Specifications (Marathon)

References

External links

Marathon
1990s United States sport aircraft
1990s United States civil utility aircraft
Single-engined tractor aircraft
Low-wing aircraft
Homebuilt aircraft